The Song of the Korean People's Army is a patriotic song of the Korean People's Army, the army of North Korea's ruling Workers' Party of Korea composed by Ri Beon-su and Ra Guk. It was adopted in 1968 as the official anthem of the KPA.

Lyrics

See also 
Music of North Korea

References

External links 
Song of the Korean People's Army

Propaganda songs
North Korean songs
Propaganda in North Korea
Patriotic songs
North Korean military marches